Sand Hill is an unincorporated community in Jones County, Mississippi, United States.

References

Unincorporated communities in Jones County, Mississippi
Unincorporated communities in Mississippi